Dirty Money is a Netflix original television series which tells stories of corporate corruption, securities fraud, and creative accounting. All six one-hour long episodes began streaming on Netflix on January 26, 2018. The show's executive producers include  Oscar-winning documentary filmmaker Alex Gibney. Each episode focuses on one example of corporate corruption and includes interviews with key players in each story. A second season of the show premiered on March 11, 2020.

Episodes

Season 1 (2018)

Season 2 (2020)

Reception 
Reaction to the series has been extremely positive. Rotten Tomatoes reported that 100% of critics have given the first season a positive review based on 13 reviews, with an average rating of 7.92/10. The site's critics consensus reads, "Informative as it is appalling, Dirty Money exposes the single-mindedness of corporate greed." On Metacritic, the first season has a weighted average score of 80 out of 100 based on 6 critic reviews, indicating "generally favorable reviews". Brian Lowry of CNN explains the main premise that "for pro-business advocates of deregulation...offers a simple yet powerful rejoinder: Look at the terrible, unethical behavior that corporate entities try getting away with when they think nobody's looking."

See also 
 Legal affairs of Donald Trump
 List of lawsuits involving Donald Trump
 List of original programs distributed by Netflix

References 

2018 American television series debuts
2010s American documentary television series
English-language Netflix original programming
Netflix original documentary television series